Apostasy is a 2017 British drama film about Jehovah's Witnesses directed by Daniel Kokotajlo. It was screened in the Discovery section at the 2017 Toronto International Film Festival. Kokotajlo was nominated at the 2019 BAFTAs for the Outstanding Debut by a British Writer, Director or Producer.

Two sisters are brought up in a tightly knit group of Jehovah's Witnesses in Oldham. The film explores guilt, love, faith as well as the interpersonal issues resulting from indoctrination and the authoritarian setting of the group.

Plot
Jehovah's Witness Ivanna Whitling lives with her two adult daughters, Alex and Luisa, in Oldham. Alex and Luisa are also members of the faith. Alex, who works as a gardener, has just turned eighteen and her older sister attends college. Alex suffers from a medical condition that causes anemia. As a result of her religious beliefs, she would not be able to accept a blood transfusion in a medical emergency. Alex's doctor tries to convince her to change her mind with the reassurance that nobody would need to know. Alex hesitates to give her the medical directive card.

Luisa and Alex go door-knocking amongst the local Urdu-speaking population to spread their faith. After taking a walk with her family in the park, Luisa reveals that she is pregnant with an ultrasound image. Ivanna condemns Luisa for having sex outside of marriage with a 'worldly' man. Luisa is disfellowshipped and an announcement is made at the Kingdom Hall indicating that she is "no longer one of Jehovah's Witnesses". As a result, Luisa is to be shunned by her family and religious community until she is reinstated. Luisa moves out and Ivanna is reminded by the elders that any contact with Luisa must only be that which is absolutely necessary.

A newly arrived elder named Steven introduces himself to Ivanna and Alex at a meeting. Steven then proceeds to visit Alex at her home. Ivanna initially assumes this to be a shepherding visit but his intentions are actually to begin a courtship with Alex. At a gathering with friends, Alex collapses. The scene fades to black before showing Ivanna in despair outside a hospital. Luisa attends Alex's funeral but is ignored by the others present. She briefly talks to her mother in the cloak room after the funeral; they hug and Luisa cries loudly in grief.

After clarifying what is acceptable with the elders, arguing that Luisa needs some basic support as she is heavily pregnant, Ivanna proceeds to visit Luisa and help her clean her flat. Ivanna encourages Luisa to continue speaking to the elders and comments about the possibility of all of them seeing Alex soon in the new system. Ivanna meets with the elder Steven to ask if Luisa is ready for reinstatement, but he says that while she is on her way, it is not quite in her heart yet. He urges Ivanna to further minimize contact and to stop visiting Luisa, as unnecessary contact with disfellowshipped individuals is itself a disfellowshipping offence. Luisa meets with the elders and they ask her what she has done to demonstrate repentance; she states that she has been respecting the disfellowshipping arrangement, living on her own for seven months, attending meetings, and praying. An elder comments that he doesn't think allowing Ivanna to clean her fridge is necessary contact. Luisa expresses frustration, saying that she has been doing all that she can and that she cannot do this anymore, before leaving in anger. She tells Ivanna that she finds the elders to be too demanding and controlling. Soon after this, Ivanna visits Luisa after she has given birth to a daughter named Leanne. Ivanna delights in holding her granddaughter, telling Luisa that she loves both of them very much. Ivanna and Luisa argue about the teachings of their religion, Ivanna making it clear that she wants Leanne to learn about God. When Luisa goes into the kitchen to get her mother a glass of water, Ivanna grabs Leanne out of her bassinet and takes her out to the car. As she is placing her on the back seat, Luisa runs out to the car and grabs Leanne. Ivanna mutters that she will "save" her granddaughter. The film concludes with a shot of Ivanna standing alone in a public space beside a stand of pamphlets promoting the faith.

Cast
 Siobhan Finneran as Ivanna Whitling
 Robert Emms as Steven
 Sacha Parkinson as Luisa Whitling
 Jessica Baglow as Michelle
 Molly Wright as Alex Whitling

See also 
 Postpartum depression

References

External links
 
 
 
 

2017 films
2017 drama films
British drama films
2010s English-language films
2010s Urdu-language films
2017 multilingual films
British multilingual films
Films about religion
Films shot in Greater Manchester
Jehovah's Witnesses
2010s British films